Chris Evert-Lloyd was the defending champion and won in the final 6–3, 2–6, 7–5 against Carling Bassett.

Seeds
A champion seed is indicated in bold text while text in italics indicates the round in which that seed was eliminated. The top eight seeds received a bye to the second round.

  Chris Evert-Lloyd (champion)
 n/a
  Bettina Bunge (quarterfinals)
  Hana Mandlíková (semifinals)
  Sylvia Hanika (quarterfinals)
  Virginia Ruzici (second round)
  Zina Garrison (third round)
  Kathy Rinaldi (semifinals)
  Bonnie Gadusek (third round)
 n/a
  Rosalyn Fairbank (first round)
  Claudia Kohde-Kilsch (third round)
  Evonne Goolagong Cawley (third round)
  Yvonne Vermaak (second round)
 n/a
 n/a

Draw

Finals

Top half

Section 1

Section 2

Bottom half

Section 3

Section 4

References
 1983 Lipton WTA Championships Draw (Archived 2009-08-11)

Singles